Cryptophasa phaethontia is a moth in the family Xyloryctidae. It was described by Edward Meyrick in 1890. It is found in Australia, where it has been recorded from Queensland.

The wingspan is about 41 mm. The forewings are deep brown reddish and the hindwings are pale ochreous, slightly reddish tinged.

References

Cryptophasa
Moths described in 1890